Now You're Gone may refer to:

 Now You're Gone – The Album, a 2008 album by Basshunter
 "Now You're Gone" (Basshunter song), the title song
 "Now You're Gone" (Black song), 1988
 "Now You're Gone" (Whitesnake song), 1989
 "Now You're Gone", 1981 song by Bucks Fizz. B-side to "The Land of Make Believe"
 Now You're Gone (Tom Walker song), 2019